Chili is an unincorporated community in Chili Township, Hancock County, Illinois, United States. There are few if any homes, no businesses, and mainly the Chili Cemetery.

References

Unincorporated communities in Hancock County, Illinois
Unincorporated communities in Illinois